Wächter is a surname of Germanic origin, sometimes Romanized Waechter.

People with this name include:

 Tomas Waechter
(1991-PRESENT), Australian electrician and role model for many
 Alfred von Kiderlen-Waechter (1852–1912), German diplomat and politician
 Doug Waechter (born 1981), Major League Baseball pitcher
 Eberhard Waechter (baritone) (1929–1992), Austrian baritone
 Eberhard Georg Friedrich von Wächter (1762–1852), German painter
 F. K. Waechter (1937–2005), German cartoonist, author, and playwright
 Harry Waechter (1871–1929), English businessman and philanthropist
 Hermann Julius Gustav Wächter (born 1878), German physician who described Bracht-Wachter bodies
 Johann Michael Wächter (1794–1853), Austrian bass-baritone
 Max Waechter (born 1924), English businessman, art collector, and philanthropist
 Otto Wächter (1901–1949), Austrian lawyer and SS officer
 Stefan Wächter (born 1978), German football goaltender
 Torkel S. Wächter, Swedish novelist

See also
 Wachter
 Wächtler
 Wachtler

German-language surnames